Vladimir Alekseyevich Fomichyov (15 August 1960 – 15 August 2019) was a Russian professional footballer.

Club career
He made his professional debut in the Soviet Top League in 1980 for FC Torpedo Moscow. He played 6 games and scored 1 goal in the European Cup Winners' Cup 1984–85 for FC Dynamo Moscow.

Honours
 Soviet Cup winner: 1984.

References

1960 births
2019 deaths
People from Novomoskovsky District
Soviet footballers
Russian footballers
Association football defenders
FC Khimik-Arsenal players
FC Torpedo Moscow players
Soviet Top League players
FC Kuban Krasnodar players
FC Dynamo Moscow players
FC Asmaral Moscow players
FC Dynamo Vologda players
Sportspeople from Tula Oblast